Several places are named in honour of the 21st Sultan of Johor, Sultan Abu Bakar who administered the state between 1862 and 1886 before being proclaimed Sultan in 1886 and reigned until his death in 1895. A good number of places named after him are buildings, although a few of them take the form of roads.

Buildings

Johor Bahru
 Maktab Sultan Abu Bakar (formerly known as English College)
 Masjid Negeri Sultan Abu Bakar (English: Sultan Abu Bakar State Mosque)
 Muzium Diraja Abu Bakar (English: Royal Abu Bakar Museum, consisting of the entire Istana Besar itself)
 Kompleks Sultan Abu Bakar, the Malaysian checkpoint complex along the Malaysia–Singapore Second Link
 Sekolah Kebangsaan Kompleks Sultan Abu Bakar, Gelang Patah

Muar
 Bangunan Sultan Abu Bakar
 Sekolah Menengah Kebangsaan Perempuan Sultan Abu Bakar, a girls' school in Muar

Roads
 Jalan Sultan Abu Bakar, Johor Bahru

References

Lists of places named after people
Lists of things named after politicians
Lists of places in Malaysia